James Sargolsem Singh (born 1 March 1985) is an Indian footballer who plays as a midfielder for Guwahati F.C. in the I-League 2nd Division.

External links
 

Indian footballers
1985 births
Living people
Footballers from Manipur
I-League players
Mohun Bagan AC players
Mumbai FC players
Association football midfielders